Rewa Lok Sabha constituency is one of the 29 Lok Sabha constituencies in Madhya Pradesh state in central India. This constituency came into existence in 1951 as one of the 4 constituencies in Vindhya Pradesh state. This constituency presently covers the entire Rewa district.

Assembly segments
Before delimitation of parliamentary constituencies in 2008, Rewa Lok Sabha constituency comprised the following eight Vidhan Sabha (legislative assembly) segments:

Members of Parliament

Election results

General Elections 2019

General Elections 2014

General Elections 2009

Towns And Villages In Rewa Lok Sabha Constituency
Rewa
Mangawan
Teonthar
Mauganj
Gurh
Malpar

See also
 Rewa district
 List of Constituencies of the Lok Sabha

References

 Election Commission of India statistics

External links
Rewa lok sabha  constituency election 2019 result details

Lok Sabha constituencies in Madhya Pradesh
Rewa district